Edel Ojeda Malpica (November 28, 1928 – April 1, 2011) was a Mexican professional boxer who competed from 1949 to 1957. As an amateur, he competed at the 1948 London Olympics. After retiring from boxing, he founded a successful commercial refrigeration company.

References

External links
 
 

1928 births
2011 deaths
Boxers from Veracruz
Olympic boxers of Mexico
Boxers at the 1948 Summer Olympics
Mexican male boxers
Bantamweight boxers